Wes McLeod (born October 24, 1957) is a retired Canadian soccer player who earned eighteen caps with the Canadian national soccer team.

Club career
Born in Vancouver, British Columbia, Canada, McLeod spent his youth career with Coquitlam Blue Mountain.  In 1976, he moved to Vancouver Columbus FC (Italia).  In 1977 McLeod signed with Tampa Bay Rowdies of the North American Soccer League.  Over eight seasons with the Rowdies, he was selected to the NASL's North American All-Star team in 1977, 1978, 1979, 1980, 1981 and 1982, a record six times.  In August 1984, he signed with the New York Cosmos of the Major Indoor Soccer League.  In February 1985, the Cosmos withdrew from the league and, McLeod signed with the Dallas Sidekicks on February 25, 1985. In seven seasons, he was a three-time All-Star and the 1989-90 Defender of the Year.  He retired in May 1992.  In September 2003 his number eight shirt was retired by the Sidekicks.

National team
McLeod made his Olympic team debut at 17 in 1975 against Poland in Toronto.  A year later he was a member of the Olympic team at the Olympic Games in Montreal and had a memorable game against the Soviet Union in the Olympic Stadium. He was a member of Canada's national team in World Cup qualifying in 1976 and in 1980 and 1981. McLeod won 18 full international caps, scoring one goal.

International goals
Scores and results list Canada's goal tally first.

Post-retirement
In the fall of 1992, McLeod was hired to coach the Clearwater High School boys' soccer team.

In April 2005 McLeod was inducted into the Canadian Soccer Hall of Fame at the same time as his uncle Norm McLeod.

References

External links
 / Canada Soccer Hall of Fame
 Dallas Sidekicks player profile
 NASL/MISL stats
 

1957 births
Living people
Canadian expatriate sportspeople in the United States
Canadian expatriate soccer players
Canada men's international soccer players
Canada Soccer Hall of Fame inductees
Canadian soccer players
Olympic soccer players of Canada
Footballers at the 1976 Summer Olympics
Canadian people of Scottish descent
Dallas Sidekicks (original MISL) players
Expatriate soccer players in the United States
Association football defenders
Major Indoor Soccer League (1978–1992) players
North American Soccer League (1968–1984) indoor players
New York Cosmos (MISL) players
North American Soccer League (1968–1984) players
Soccer players from Vancouver
Tampa Bay Rowdies (1975–1993) players
Vancouver Columbus players